Hong Kong Baptist University (HKBU or BaptistU) is a publicly funded tertiary liberal arts institution with a Christian education heritage. It was established as Hong Kong Baptist College with the support of American Baptists, who provided both operating and construction funds and personnel to the school in its early years. It became a public college in 1983.

It became Hong Kong Baptist University in 1994 during the presidency of Dr. Daniel Tse Chi-wai, LLD, GBS, CBE, JP, who succeeded the Founding President, Dr. Lam Chi-fung, as the second president of the university in 1971. After 30 years of services to the university, Dr. Daniel Tse Chi-wai retired in 2001 and Prof. Ng Ching-fai, GBS, was appointed as the third president of the university. In 2010, Prof. Albert Chan Sun-chi assumed office as the fourth president of HKBU. In 2015, Prof. Roland Chin was appointed as the fifth President of HKBU. On 1 February 2021, Prof. Alexander Ping-kong Wai became the sixth President and Vice-Chancellor of HKBU. 

HKBU has five main campuses: Ho Sin Hang Campus (1966), Shaw Campus (1995), Baptist University Road Campus (1998), Kai Tak Campus (2005), and Shek Mun Campus (2006) for the College of International Education and the Hong Kong Baptist University Affiliated School Wong Kam Fai Secondary and Primary School. The first three campuses are located in the urban heart of Kowloon Tsai, while the Kai Tak Campus is located on Kwun Tong Road and the Shek Mun Campus in the Shek Mun area of Sha Tin District near Shek Mun station.

In 2005, the university established the Beijing Normal University – Hong Kong Baptist University United International College (UIC) in Zhuhai, China. The college was the first tertiary education institution founded through collaboration between a Mainland university and a Hong Kong university.

History
The Hong Kong Baptist College was opened on 11 September 1956 on the premises of the Pui Ching Middle School, a Baptist-affiliated secondary school, with an initial enrolment of 152 students. In 1957 the government gave the college land on Waterloo Road to build a permanent campus, which was completed in 1966.

The Hong Kong Baptist College Bill 1983 was passed by the Legislative Council on 10 August 1983. The college previously fell under the purview of the Post Secondary Colleges Ordinance and received funding from the Education Department. After this bill became law, the college instead began to receive funding from the University and Polytechnic Grants Committee.

The third reading of the Hong Kong Baptist College (Amendment) Bill was passed by the Legislative Council on 16 November 1994, transforming the college into the Hong Kong Baptist University.

Rankings 
HKBU was ranked 281st worldwide by the QS World University Ranking 2023, and 501-600th worldwide by the Times Higher Education World University Rankings 2023.

HKBU was ranked 102nd in the Times Higher Education Young University Rankings 2022, and 68th in the QS Asian University Ranking 2023.

The QS Graduate Employability Ranking 2022 placed HKBU at 301-500th worldwide.

University identities

Emblem
The emblem of Hong Kong Baptist University consists of three pictorial elements: the Bible, waves and knots. The Bible symbolises the unique quality of Christian education which includes moral and spiritual training in addition to academic education. The waves, on the other hand, symbolise both Hong Kong's geographic nature as an island while echoing Confucius' dictum that "the wise love water" and the University's continuing effort to improve its educational quality. The knots, the final symbol, illustrate that within God's embrace, Christians are harmoniously linked and loved.

Logo
The logo, embodying a book and water motifs, was adopted after the institution was granted its university status in 1994. The acronym "BU" coupled with the outlined book on the logo resembles the Chinese characters of welcome (迎) and progress (進), conceptualising the merging of eastern and western cultures. The design of the logo was commended at a design competition held in October 1996. The Hong Kong Designers Association awarded a Certificate of Merit at the Design 96 Show to Kan & Lau Design Consultants for creating the logo.

Governance 
Prior to Hong Kong's handover, the colony's governor was the de jure chancellor of the university. That role has been assumed by Hong Kong's chief executive following the handover.

The chief executive's role as the university's Chancellor is enshrined in the Hong Kong Baptist University Ordinance.

For a list of pre- and post-handover university chancellors, refer to the articles for the Governor of Hong Kong and the Chief executive of Hong Kong.

Academic organisations and rankings

Faculties and Schools

Major facilities

The campus is located within Kowloon City.

Academic Community Hall
The Academic Community Hall (AC Hall) is an auditorium located in the university. It was opened in May 1978 with a seating capacity of 1,346. Originally, the first president and co-founder of the university, Dr. Lam Chi-fung, conceived the idea of building a hall for university functions. In 1970, on the occasion of their golden wedding anniversary, Dr. and Mrs. Lam donated half a million dollars towards the construction of the auditorium. A local architect, Eric Cumine, took charge of the project. However, Dr. Lam died the following year before the project got underway. The Board of Governors decided to honour Dr. Lam by expanding the planned auditorium into a much larger scale project – the development of the Lam Chi-fung Memorial Building. As a part of the project, the Academic Community Hall would serve as a cultural centre for the university and its surrounding community, thus providing a direct link between town and gown.

Communication and Visual Art Building
The Communication and Visual Art Building is located in 5 Hereford Road, Kowloon Tong. The building was built for the School of Communication and Academy of Visual Arts.

Library
The Hong Kong Baptist University Library is made up by a Main Library and a number of branches. The Main Library is located in Au Shue Hung Memorial Library Building and has a gross floor area of 6,900 m2 with a seating capacity of about 850. The library is fully automated with integrated library systems and house a comprehensive collection of Chinese and Western books, periodicals, non-print materials and newspaper clippings. Of particular importance are the Archives on the History of Christianity in China and the Contemporary China Research Collection, as well as a lantern slide and glass plate negative collection entitled "China Through The Eyes of CIM Missionaries."

The Dr. Stephen Riady Chinese Medicine Library is located on the second floor of the Jockey Club School of Chinese Medicine Building. It aims to meet the growing demand in the development of Chinese medicine in Hong Kong. The European Documentation Centre is located in the Academic and Administrative Building and is open to the public. It provides an important study and research base for European Studies. The Shek Mun Campus Library is a branch of the Hong Kong Baptist University Library. It is established to provide quality information resources and services in support of teaching and learning activities of the College of International Education in Shek Mun Campus.

After investigation, the library decided to abandon the practice of binding the majority of its western language periodical collection from 2007 onwards, substituting it with magazine boxes and possibly shrink wrapping.

Students' residences
The Student Residence Halls of HKBU are located at the Baptist University Road campus:
 Ching-Ling Soong Hall, (C.L. Soong Hall) (宋慶齡堂)
 Chen-Ning Yang Hall, (C.N. Yang Hall) (楊振寧堂)
 Shu-Ren Zhou Hall, (S.R. Zhou Hall) (周樹人堂)
 Yuan-Pei Cai Hall, (Y.P. Cai Hall) (蔡元培堂)

The College of International Education
The College of International Education (CIE), which is under the School of Continuing Education, offers programmes from certificates, higher diplomas, professional diplomas, associate degrees, undergraduate and higher degrees for over 6,300 full-time students and 8,200 part-time students to have the opportunities to pursue further study. CIE has their academic activities mainly in the new Shek Mun Campus (8 On Muk Street, Shek Mun, Sha Tin). The rest of the academic activities are based in Madam Chan Wu Wan Kwai School of Continuing Education Tower on campus, and acquired a 48,000 sq. ft. office in Franki Centre, Kowloon Tong.

See also
 Education in Hong Kong
 List of universities in Hong Kong
 Dr & Mrs Hung Hin Shiu Museum of Chinese Medicine

References

External links

Hong Kong Baptist University Beijing Office 

 
Educational institutions established in 1956
Christian colleges in China
Association of Christian Universities and Colleges in Asia
1956 establishments in Hong Kong
Liberal arts colleges
Protestantism in Hong Kong